The 2016 China Amateur Football League season was the 15th season since its establishment in 2002. It is the highest amateur association football league in PR China with some semi-professional clubs. 44 clubs were qualified for the second round.

Promotion and relegation 
Teams promoted to 2016 China League Two
 Suzhou Dongwu
 Hainan Seamen
 Shenzhen Renren
 Shenyang Urban

Format
The qualification structure is as follows:
First round: Chinese Football Association subordinate Provincial, City League, champion will advance to the second round.
Second round: It is divided into four groups, Northeast, Northwest, Southeast and Southwest. The top four teams of each group will advance to Third round.
Third round: It is divided into four groups, Group A, Group B, Group C and Group D. The four winners may be qualify for the 2017 China League Two.

First round
 
China Amateur Football League includes 44 regional leagues. Number of teams: 1000+

Teams qualified for the second round
{| class="wikitable"
|-
! Groups
! Team
! City
! Qualifying method
! Position
! Ref
|-
| rowspan="10" style="text-align:center;"| Northeast
| Dalian Boyang
| Dalian 
| Qualified position of Dalian Longjuanfeng
| 
| 
|-
| Dalian Teha
| Dalian 
| 2015-16 Dalian City Super League
| Winners
| 
|-
| Hebei Lion
| Cangzhou
| 2016 Hebei Provincial Amateur League
| Winners
| 
|-
| Heilongjiang Tianfeng
| Daqing
| 2016 Daqing City Football League
| Winners
| 
|-
| Jilin Baijia
| Changchun
| 2016 Changchun City Amateur League (Super Group)
| Winners
| 
|-
| Shenyang West Winner
| Shenyang
| 2016 Shenyang City Super League 
| Winners
|  
|-
| Tianjin Kunshengsong
| Tianjin
| 2016 Tianjin City Amateur League
| Winners
| 
|-
| Zhangjiakou Zhuoyue
| Zhangjiakou
| 2016 Hebei Provincial Amateur League
| Runners-up
| 
|-
| Zibo Qi Eagle
| Zibo
| 2016 Shandong Provincial Super League
| Runners-up
| 
|-
| Zibo Sunday
| Zibo
| 2016 Shandong Provincial Super League
| Winners
| 
|-
| rowspan="10" style="text-align:center;"| Northwest
| Lanzhou Xiangchen
| Lanzhou
| 
| 
| 
|-
| Henan Orient Classic
| Zhengzhou
| 2016 Zhengzhou City Amateur League
| 3rd place
| 
|-
| Hubei Huachuang
| Wuhan
| 2016 Chinago Champions League (South Group)
| Winners
| 
|-
| Manzhouli Biancheng Xuelang
| Manzhouli
| 2016 CAL Inner Mongolia Qualifying play-off
| Winners
| 
|-
| Inner Mongolia Shengle Mongolian Sheep
| Horinger
| 2016 CAL Inner Mongolia Qualifying play-off
| Runners-up
| 
|-
| Shaanxi Chang'an Athletic
| Xi'an
| 2016 Shaanxi Provincial Super League
| Winners
| 
|-
| Shanxi Dragon City
| Taiyuan
| 2016 Shanxi Provincial Football League (A Group)
| Winners
| 
|-
| Wuhan Chufeng Heli
| Wuhan
| 2016 Wuhan City Super League
| Winners
| 
|-
| Wuhan Dongfeng Honda
| Wuhan
| 2016 Wuhan City Super League
| Runners-up
| 
|-
| Xi'an Yilian
| Xi'an
| 
|
| 
|-
| rowspan="12" style="text-align:center;"| Southeast
| Anhui Sanchuan
| Hefei
| 2016 Anhui Provincial Football League 
| Winners
| 
|-
| Hangzhou Ange
| Hangzhou
| 2016 Zhejiang FA Cup
| Winners
| 
|-
| Nanjing Shaye
| Nanjing
| 2016 Nanjing City Super League
| Winners
| 
|-
| Ningbo Yinbo
| Ningbo
| 2015 Zhejiang Provincial Champions' League
| Winners
| 
|-
| Qingdao Red Lions
| Qingdao
| 2016 Qingdao City Super League
| 3rd place
| 
|-
| Qingdao QUST 
| Qingdao
| 2016 Qingdao City Super League
| 4th place
| 
|-
| Shanghai Yangpu Chuanglin
| Shanghai
| 2016 Shanghai City "Chen Yi Cup" Football Championship
| Runners-up
| 
|-
| Shanghai Sunfun
| Shanghai
| 2016 Shanghai City "Chen Yi Cup" Football Championship
| Winners
| 
|-
| Shenzhen Baoxin
| Shenzhen
| 2016 Shenzhen City Football League
| Winners
| 
|-
| Shenzhen Yisheng
| Shenzhen
| 2016 Shenzhen City Football League
| Runners-up
| 
|-
| Wuxi Yinyang
| Wuxi
| 2016 Jiangsu Provincial Football League 
| Runners-up
| 
|-
| Zhenjiang Huasa
| Zhenjiang
| 2016 Jiangsu Provincial Football League 
| Winners
| 
|-
| rowspan="12" style="text-align:center;"| Southwest
| Anhui Hefei Guiguan
| Hefei
| 2016 Anhui Provincial Football League 
| Runners-up
| 
|-
| Changsha Sihai
| Changsha
| 2016 Hunan Provincial Super League
| Winners
| 
|-
| Chengdu Yifeng
| Chengdu
| 2016 Chengdu City Super League
| 5th
| 
|-
| Chongqing Dikai
| Chongqing
| 2016 Chongqing City League One
| Winners
| 
|
|-
| Guangxi Wodema
| Nanning
| 2016 Guangxi Provincial Football League 
| Runners-up
| 
|-
| Lhasa Pure Land
| Lhasa
| 2016 Lhasa City League One
| Runners-up
| 
|-
| Liuzhou Ranko
| Liuzhou
| 2016 Guangxi Provincial Football League 
| Winners
| 
|-
| Sichuan Jinguancheng
| Chengdu
| 2016 Chengdu City Super League
| Runners-up
| 
|-
| Sichuan Youth
| Chengdu
| 2016 Sichuan Provincial Football League
| Winners
| 
|-
| Yunnan Xinyuexin
| Kunming
| 2016 Chinago Champions League (South Group)
| 3rd place
|  
|-
| Zhaoqing Hengtai
| Zhaoqing
| 2015 Guangdong Provincial Football League
| Winners
| 
|-
| Zhuhai Suoka
| Zhuhai
| 
| 
| 
|-

Second round

Northeast Group

Group A

Group B

Northwest Group

Group A

Group B

Southeast Group

Group A

Group B

Group C

Play-offs

Southwest Group

Group A

Group B

Group C

Play-offs

Teams qualified for the third round

Third round

Groups

Group A

Group B

Group C

Group D

Quarter-finals

5th–8th place semifinals

Semi-finals

Seventh-Place Match

Fifth-Place Match

Third-Place Match

Final

References

External links
Official site 

4